The Little Thing (French: Le petit chose) is a 1923 French silent film directed by André Hugon and starring Max de Rieux, Alexiane and Jean Debucourt. It is based on the 1868 work Le Petit Chose by Alphonse Daudet.

Cast
 Max de Rieux as Daniel Eysette  
 Alexiane as Camille Pierrotte  
 Jean Debucourt as Jacques Eysette  
 Claude Mérelle as Irma Borel  
 Gilbert Dalleu as Le père de Pierrotte  
 André Calmettes as Monsieur Viot  
 Jeanne Bérangère as La fée aux lunettes

References

Bibliography
 Rège, Philippe. Encyclopedia of French Film Directors, Volume 1. Scarecrow Press, 2009.

External links

1923 films
Films based on works by Alphonse Daudet
Films directed by André Hugon
French silent feature films
French black-and-white films
1920s French films